In Greek mythology, Broteas (Ancient Greek: Βροτέας), a hunter, was the son of Tantalus (by Dione, Euryanassa or Eurythemista), whose other offspring were Niobe and Pelops.

Broteas was also one of the Lapiths, killed at the battle of the Lapiths and the centaurs.

Historical accounts
Broteas was consumed on a pyre as a propitiating sacrifice. The mythic rationale, that he was a famous hunter who refused to honour Artemis.  Artemis then drove him mad, causing him to immolate himself.

He can be compared to the hunter Actaeon, whose sacrifice is also justified as retribution. 
Broteas had a son Tantalus, like his grandfather.

A Hesiodic papyrus fragment from Oxyrhyncus connects Dardanus, Broteas and Pandion, in a tradition of which there is no further evidence.

Manisa relief 

This ancient rock carving was famous in antiquity. It's located near the town of Magnesia ad Sipylum, and it was believed to have been carved by Broteas. He was said to have carved the most ancient image of the Great Mother of the Gods (Cybele), an image that in Pausanias' day (2nd century CE) was still held sacred by the Magnesians. 

The sculpture was carved into the rock-face  of the crag Coddinus, north of Spil Mount-Mount Sipylus, whose daemon was one of the mythographers' candidates for Broteas' grandfather.

The rock-cut carving mentioned by Pausanias was identified with the Manisa relief in 1881 by W. M. Ramsay and is still to be seen above the road about 6 or 7 km east of Manisa (the modern descendant of Magnesia ad Sipylum), though the head has partly cleaved away, from natural causes. The figure 8–10 metres high carved in a recess in the a cliff-face a hundred metres above the marshy plain near the village of Akpinar, has come to be confused with a nearby natural rock formation associated with Niobe, the "Niobe of Sipylus" (the "Weeping Rock", in Turkish Ağlayan Kaya), also mentioned by Pausanias.

Apart from the badly damaged head, the sitting figure is clear enough to be made out by a non-professional. The goddess with the polos headgear holds her breasts with her hands; a vague trace of four Hittite hieroglyphics could be seen on a squared section to the right of her head. The site is Hittite, second millennium BCE.

Nearby, other archaeological sites traditionally associated with the House of Tantalus since Antiquity are also in fact Hittite. Some 2 km east of Akpınar there are another two monuments on Spil Mount, which are also mentioned by Pausanias: the tomb of Tantalus (Christianized as "Saint Charalambos' tomb") and the "throne of Pelops", in fact a rocky altar.

Brotheus and Renaissance invective
In literature of the Renaissance and later, Broteas is most often called "Brotheus" and described as a son of Vulcan who cast himself into the flames, sometimes specified as those of Mount Aetna, because of his deformity. The immediate source for the Renaissance trope of Brotheus and his self-immolation was Ovid's curse poem Ibis, an erudite rant of gruesome threats cataloguing the fates of numerous mythic and historical figures. Ovid's reference is minimal: "May you consign your body parts, set on fire, to the pyre to be cremated, as they say Broteas did out of a desire for death."

The Italian humanist and literary agitator Domizio Calderini, also known in Latin as Domitius Calderinus, appended the Ibis to his annotated edition of Martial (1474). Calderini's note says that Brotheus was the son of Vulcan and Minerva; scorned because of his ugliness, he cast himself into a burning pyre. The same year, drawing on his classical sources, Calderini published a Defensio adversus Brotheum ("Defense against Brotheus"), an attack on his literary rivals Angelo Sabino and Niccolò Perotti under the pseudonyms "Fidentinus," after the plagiarist in Book 1 of Martial's epigrams, and "Brotheus." The literary feud is mentioned in several sources, including Gyraldus, and its notoriety helped establish the predominant version of the myth in the 15th–18th centuries.

The idiosyncratic but enormously influential Mythologiae of Natalis Comes (1567) uses this version in a chapter on the aspects of Vulcan and his progeny: "Brotheus, who was mocked by everyone because of his ill-formed appearance, hurled himself into the fire, as if to escape libel by death." This description is repeated closely in The Anatomy of Melancholy (1621) by Robert Burton, and early 19th-century versions of Samuel Johnson's Dictionary specify that Brotheus "threw himself into Mount Ætna."

21st-century Brotheus
Broteas, under the Renaissance spelling Brotheus, is also a character in "Anakhronismos," a long-form poem with mock annotations by Mike Ladd. In the poem, Brotheus is called a philosopher and attends the cinema with the poem's speaker, the fictional Aponius Maso. The note identifies Brotheus as the "deformed son of Vulcan and Minerva who burned himself because of the ridicule he suffered."

Notes

References 
Robert Graves, 1960. The Greek Myths (Section 108).
Pausanias, Greece, iii.22.4.
Apollodorus, Epitome, i.24; ii.2.
Ovid, Ibis, line 517 (with scholiast noted by Graves).
168. Manisa / Magnesia on Sipylus. Archaeological Atlas of the Aegean, map 168. Retrieved: March 10, 2006.

Kings in Greek mythology
Anatolian characters in Greek mythology
Cybele
Children of Vulcan (mythology)
Mythological hunters
Deeds of Artemis